Elvin Ayala (born January 15, 1981) is an American professional boxer. He is a former world-title challenger.

Early life 
Born in Reading, Pennsylvania, but raised in New Haven, Connecticut, Ayala took up boxing as a way to stay off the streets and out of trouble. He credits former light heavyweight world champion Chad Dawson as one of his early influences.

"I really didn’t have any schooling," Ayala said, "and there were drugs everywhere I grew up. When I came to Connecticut, Chad was coming up at the time and becoming a star and making money, and I’m like, 'Wait, you can make money off this?'

"I didn’t want to live a life where I had to look over my shoulder all the time, but I still needed to make money. I didn’t want to live in poverty anymore."

Professional career 

At the age of 22, Ayala made his professional debut on September 19, 2003, with a unanimous decision win over Michael Gutrick in Toms River, New Jersey, a short distance from his hometown of Reading, Pennsylvania.

Within a year, Ayala improved his professional record to 7–0 with one knockout. On November 11, 2004, Ayala earned his eighth professional win by knocking out Chance Leggett, then 11–3, in the seventh round of a scheduled eight-round bout at The Roxy in Boston, Massachusetts. The victory over Leggett began a stretch of three consecutive knockout wins for Ayala.

Ayala eventually won his first 16 fights before facing his toughest test to date against future The Contender reality television participant David Banks, who was 12-1-1 at the time, on November 24, 2006, at The Roxy. Ayala lost a narrow split decision, 94–97, 95–96, 96-94 — the first loss of his professional career. Three months later, Ayala faced Banks again, this time losing by unanimous decision, 91–99, 93–97, 94–96, at Mohegan Sun in February 2007.

Ayala bounced back with back-to-back wins against Dillon Carew and Jose Angel Roman in Connecticut and closed the year with arguably his most impressive performance in a controversial draw against then-unbeaten The Contender Season 1 champion Sergio Mora at the Home Depot Center in Carson, California. Ayala lost, 91–99, on judge David Mendoza's scorecard, but won the bout, 96–94, on Raul Caiz Jr.'s scorecard. Max DeLuca judged the bout even at 95-95.

The draw dropped Ayala's record to 18-2-1, setting up the biggest fight of Ayala's young career — a showdown against undefeated International Boxing Federation (IBF) middleweight world champion Arthur Abraham. The bout took place on March 29, 2008, in Germany two months after Ayala's 27th birthday. Abraham won the majority of the rounds, sending Ayala to the canvas in the fifth, and finished Ayala for good via 12th-round knockout with just 28 seconds remaining in the fight. Abraham improved to 26–0 with the win, which was also his seventh world-title defense.

Following a 10-month stretch of inactivity, Ayala returned with back-to-back wins against Antony Bartinelli and Eddie Caminero before losing a United States Boxing Association (USBA) middleweight title bout against former world-title challenger Lajuan Simon by unanimous decision at the Palms Casino Resort.

Ayala then traveled to Montreal, Quebec in June 2010 to face hometown favorite David Lemieux, who entered the bout at 22–0 with 21 knockouts, on ESPN's Friday Night Fights for the WBC International middleweight title. Ayala hit the canvas three times in the opening round and lost by technical knockout at the 2:44 mark. "There were so many excuses after the loss [to Lemieux]. Everyone had all these reasons," Ayala said. “I felt the only reason was because I was too heavy and had to lose the weight rapidly. I was drained. Who can fight like that? My four-year-old daughter could’ve hit me that day and knocked me out."

After his loss to Lemieux, Ayala stringed together six wins against lesser opposition and won the USNBC title along the way. Ayala would then lose a fight to Curtis Stevens for the NABF title via round 1 stoppage. Stevens overpowered Ayala, knocking him down twice in the first round.

Ayala won an upset unanimous decision (78-74, 78–74, 77–75) over Mayweather Promotions prospect Ronald Gavril. However, Ayala would lose his next fight to Sergiy Derevyanchenko by unanimous decision. In November 2016, Ayala defeated Marcos Reyes by round 7 TKO. This was Ayala's first stoppage win in over 4 years.

Professional boxing record

References

External links 
 
 Classic Entertainment & Sports

1981 births
Living people
Sportspeople from New Haven, Connecticut
American male boxers
Middleweight boxers
Boxers from Connecticut
Sportspeople from Reading, Pennsylvania
Boxers from Pennsylvania